The men's 100 metre backstroke competition at the 2014 Pan Pacific Swimming Championships took place on 21 August at the Gold Coast Aquatic Centre, Queensland, Australia.  The last champion was Aaron Peirsol of US.

This race consisted of two lengths of the pool, all in backstroke.

Records
Prior to this competition, the existing world and Pan Pacific records were as follows:

Results
All times are in minutes and seconds.

Heats
The first round was held on 21 August, at 11:04.

B Final 
The B final was held on 21 August, at 20:20.

A Final 
The A final was held on 21 August, at 20:20.

References

2014 Pan Pacific Swimming Championships